Sahni is a village near Lakhpur, Tehsil Phagwara, Kapurthala district, in Punjab, India.
The village is also known as Lakhpur Sahni.
This village is located on the road from village Rawal-pindi to village Panchhata.

Demographics
According to the 2001 Census, Sahni has a population of 1,264 people. Neighbouring villages include Lakhpur, Malikhpur, Nasirabad, Rampur Khalyan, Prempur, Harbanspur, Rampur Sunra and Bir Dhadoli.

Sahni is situated on the Phagwara-Hoshiarpur Road. It is 14 km from Phagwara, 29 km from Hoshiarpur, 35 km from Jalandhar and 55 km from Ludhiana. Most of the population belongs to Kaushal and Kahlon clans. The village has a Government High School.

References

Villages in Kapurthala district